d'Arcy William Doyle (19 November 1932 – 28 August 2001) was a painter of Australian landscapes and historical scenes.

Personal life 

d'Arcy Doyle was born in Ipswich, Queensland, Australia on 19 November 1932 to parents Thomas Doyle and Marguerite McGrath. The family had an Irish Catholic working-class background and his father was a railway worker. The family home was at 39 Darling Street and that house and the surrounding area are featured in many of d'Arcy's paintings.

From an early age he took a keen interest in drawing. As there were few opportunities for artists in Ipswich, he studied and copied the work of local sign writers. He was completely self-taught as an artist.

Aged 18 years, Doyle joined the Royal Australian Navy with some friends and served for seven years, seeing active service in the Korean War.

After finishing in the navy, Doyle worked as a painter and sign writer. In 1961, he found the confidence to become an artist on a full-time basis.

Doyle worked in Sydney during the 1960s. His career progressed when the Belmore Returned Services Club of Sydney commissioned him to paint a mural on the club walls. This was so popular that he received many similar commissions from other clubs.

He married his wife Jennefer Taylor in Brisbane in December 1968 and they had two daughters.

d'Arcy Doyle and his family returned to Queensland in 1973, purchasing a block of land in Mudgeeraba on the Gold Coast, Queensland where d'Arcy lived and worked until his death at home on 28 August 2001 having battled bone cancer for a decade. He is buried in the Mudgeeraba cemetery at the Gold Coast, Queensland.

Art 

Doyle has a deep affinity with the Australian bush and his work focuses on horses, sheep, drovers, and other farm activities as well as children's games and sport. Influenced by Norman Rockwell, the well-known American illustrator, d'Arcy Doyle gives us a nostalgic impression of post-war Brisbane and Ipswich as he recalls it.

d'Arcy's work was very well known as he marketed many of his paintings as prints, which were very popular with the public and which were also licensed for use on calendars and biscuit tins. It was estimated that 1 in 10 Australian homes had one of his works in some form.

After his death, the d'Arcy Doyle Art Awards were established to perpetuate his memory and to encourage others in creation of quintessentially Australian Art.

External links 
D'arcy Doyle Memorial Gallery
 Opening of the Ipswich Mall and d'Arcy Doyle Place on 9 December 2005.
 Link to the artist's biography.

Notes 

 

1932 births
2001 deaths
Landscape artists
People from Ipswich, Queensland
20th-century Australian painters
Deaths from bone cancer
Deaths from cancer in Queensland